The Captain Crotty was Houston's second fireboat.  When commissioned in 1950 she replaced the Port Houston.  She was joined by Houston's third fireboat, the Captain J.L. Farnsworth in 1973.  In 1983 she, in turn was retired, replaced by the J.S. Bracewell and Howard T. Tellepsen.

According to Motorboating magazine she was "highly maneuverable", while built to a "relatively inexpensive" design.

After she was retired she was sold to Ocean Diving Adventures Incorporated, for $50,000.

She was named after Charles Crotty, who had been assistant director of the Port.  The name was picked through a contest.

References 

Fireboats of Houston
Ships built in Camden, New Jersey
1950 ships